Marina Perezagua is a writer and an open water swimmer. She was born in Seville, Spain. She graduated in Art History from the University of Seville. She obtained her PhD in philology in the United States and later on she became a professor of language, literature, history and Latin American cinema at the State University of New York at Stony Brook. Afterwards she worked for two years at the Instituto Cervantes de Lyon. She has three M.A and one Ph.D. Today she lives in New York and works as Distinguished Professor in Residence at New York University. Her last book was illustrated by the international acclaimed painter Walton Ford. She is a recipient of the Sor Juana Inés de la Cruz Prize and she has been translated into 11 languages. She is a frequent columnist for El País.

Published Books

- Criaturas Abisales (Los Libros del Lince, 2011)

- Leche (Los libros del Lince, 2013)

- Yoro (Los libros del Lince, 2015)

- Don Quijote de Manhattan (Malpaso, 2016)

- Seis formas de morir en Texas (Anagrama,2019)

- Nana de la Medusa (Espasa, March 2023)

- A - 122 metros, coauthor with Miguel Lozano (Planeta, September 2023)

People from Seville
University of Seville alumni
Living people
Spanish women short story writers
Spanish short story writers
New York University faculty
Year of birth missing (living people)